The Grawemeyer Award for Music Composition is an annual prize instituted by Henry Charles Grawemeyer, industrialist and entrepreneur, at the University of Louisville in 1984. The award was first given in 1985. Subsequently, the Grawemeyer Award was expanded to other categories: Ideas Improving World Order (instituted in 1988), Education (1989), Religion (1990) and Psychology (2000). The prize fund was initially an endowment of US$9 million from the Grawemeyer Foundation. The initial awards were for $150 000 each, increasing to $200 000 for the year 2000 awards. After the economic crash of 2008, the prize was reduced to $100,000.

The selection process includes three panels of judges. The first is a panel of faculty from the University of Louisville, who hosts and maintains the perpetuity of the award. The second is a panel of music professionals, often involving conductors, performers, and composers (most frequently the previous winner). The final decision is made by a lay committee of new music enthusiasts who are highly knowledgeable about the state of new music. This final committee of amateurs makes the final prize determination because Grawemeyer insisted that great ideas are not exclusively the domain of academic experts.

The award has most often been awarded to large-scale works, such as symphonies, concerti, and operas.  Only two Award-winning pieces (György Ligeti's Études, for piano; and Sebastian Currier's Static, for flute, clarinet, violin, cello and piano) do not require a conductor in performance.

Only four years have seen no prize awarded. In 1988, the second panel, consisting of professional musicians (which that year included previous winner Harrison Birtwistle) determined that no work was deserving of the award. In 1999, the awarding of the prize was moved from the fall semester to the spring semester due to the University of Louisville's bicentennial celebrations, which meant that that year's winner (Thomas Adès) was given the prize in the spring of 2000 rather than the fall of 1999. The prize has been awarded in the spring each year since.

Recipients of the Grawemeyer Award for Music Composition

References

External links
 The Grawemeyer Award for Music Composition

American music awards
Classical music awards
Contemporary classical music
Awards established in 1984
University of Louisville